Middleford is an unincorporated community in Sussex County, Delaware, United States. Middleford is located at the intersection of Old Furnace Road and Middleford Road, northeast of Seaford.

References

Unincorporated communities in Sussex County, Delaware
Unincorporated communities in Delaware